Wojnarowicz is a  Polish surname. Nowadays it is gender-neutral, although in the past the feminine forms Wojnarowiczówna and Wojnarowiczowa existed.

The surname may refer to
David Wojnarowicz (1954–1992), American painter, photographer, writer, filmmaker and performance artist
Janusz Wojnarowicz (born 1980), Polish judoka

Polish-language surnames